Gamemnae is a fictional character appearing in American comic books published by DC Comics. She was an enemy of the Justice League. Gamemnae first appeared in JLA #69 and was created by Joe Kelly and Doug Mahnke.

Gamemnae appeared in live-action in the fifth and sixth seasons of the Arrowverse television series Supergirl portrayed by Cara Buono.

Fictional character biography
Born over three thousand years ago, Gamemnae was an Atlantean, exiled at birth from Atlantis for having blonde hair - considered a curse in Atlantean culture. Surviving her exile, Gamemnae went on to learn powerful magic, which she later used to not only raise Atlantis from the seas, but turn the entire population into air-breathers as opposed to the water-breathing race they had been for centuries. Convinced that it was her destiny to lead the people of Atlantis in conquest of the world, Gamemnae soon established herself as ruler of her people, gradually learning further spells to increase her power.

However, Gamemnae learned that all her efforts would be for nothing when Aquaman and the Atlanteans of the twenty-first century were banished back to the past by Tempest's desperate attempt to save the city from an Imperiex probe during the Our Worlds at War storyline.  Outraged to learn that Atlantis would become a race of water-breathers once again in the future, she seduced Aquaman and tricked him into drinking a potion that turned him into a water spirit, subsequently confining him in a pool of water in the middle of Atlantis while his people were forced to work as slave labor underwater, building foundations to keep Atlantis above the water.

Having read Aquaman's mind, Gamemnae knew of the Justice League that existed in the future, and also knew that they would inevitably seek to rescue their fallen comrade. Determined to defeat them, Gamemnae created her own "League of Ancients", consisting of various people in the world who might become a threat to Atlantis in the future. This League's members included:

 Rama Khan, ruler of the nation of Jarhanpur, capable of commanding the elements of Earth and Fire.
 Manitou Raven, a powerful wielder of magic.
 The Anointed One, a fallen alien who was raised by a Jewish sect as a fallen angel, possessing physical strength equal to that of Superman.
 The Whaler, a Northern Eurasian who can harness the power of the Aurora Borealis.
 Tezumak, from a pre-Aztec Mesoamerican civilization that reached a technological peak before any other culture; wore powerful bronze armor oiled in the blood of his victims and had a natural knack for understanding technology.
 Sela, a living weapon-woman who passed a long series of mystical trials.

With this "League of Ancients" behind her, Gamemnae fed false visions of the future to Rama Khan, causing him to believe that he had foreseen a future where Earth would be threatened by a seven-headed hydra destroyer — the remaining members of the Justice League — and that a team would have to be assembled to defeat the threat posed by this destroyer. When the Justice League eventually arrived in the past to rescue Aquaman and the Atlanteans, the Ancients managed to prevail over the League, as their willingness to kill granted them a significant advantage, but Manitou Raven, having witnessed Green Lantern turn from the fight to save innocent Atlanteans, and "testing" Batman with his tomahawk that could not pierce the skin of a good man, realized that the League were genuinely good people and confronted Gamemnae with the truth of her betrayal. Learning that Gamemnae had used a quagmire spell to absorb the other members of the League of Ancients, thus adding to her power, Manitou used the souls of the deceased Justice Leaguers, the spell reinforced by Kyle's willingly sacrificed heart, to create a spell of containment that would trap Gamemnae in Atlantis until, paradoxically, Raven's past self broke it by traveling back to the past following a trip to the future.

Awakened in the present, Gamemnae began to drain the water from the entire world to force humanity to submit to her, only to find herself opposed by a "reserve League" created by Batman in the event the original League was killed or defeated, led by Nightwing and consisting of Green Arrow, the Atom, Hawkgirl, Major Disaster, Firestorm, Faith, and Jason Blood/Etrigan. Mocking Nightwing's attempts to stand up to her, Gamemnae absorbed Major Disaster, Zatanna and Tempest, the League's only victory being a pyrrhic one when Jason Blood sacrificed himself to free Zatanna.

Fortunately, the now-elderly Manitou, having hidden away to wait for the moment when he could act without changing history, rescued the League from Gamemnae's attack, revealing that she had formed a bond between herself and Atlantis to strengthen her power. Unable to defeat Gamemnae in the present, Nightwing, Hawkgirl, Zatanna and Firestorm travelled back in time to disrupt Gamemnae's connection to Atlantis in the past, freeing Aquaman by linking his pool to the sea; although he was still a water wraith, he now had the whole ocean to use as his body, allowing him to sink Atlantis and undo Gamemnae's 'Obsidian Age' of darkness and shame.

Meanwhile, in the present, the remaining Leaguers confronted Gamemnae with the aid of the resurrected corpses of the League she had already killed; unable to absorb the dead, Gamemnae was forced to resurrect them to kill them properly, only to realize too late that this had been her enemies' plan all along. Aided by the Martian Manhunter's telepathic prompting, Blood was able to free himself from the quagmire spell by transforming into Etrigan, the Atom shrinking down to rescue Major Disaster and Tempest from Gamemnae while Manitou transformed himself into a giant to better battle the now-giant Gamemnae. As Gamemnae vowed to banish the water and send Earth into the sun, the League, aided by the sacrifice of the future Manitou, managed to keep Earth's orbit stable as the water returned; Superman, Wonder Woman and Martian Manhunter using the Lasso of Truth to hold Earth in place as the water returned while the Flash ran to the North Pole and absorbed the kinetic energy their actions caused to prevent it causing dangerous earthquakes and finally, an empowered Green Lantern in Ion form who cradled the world in his hands thanks to the sacrifice of Manitou's future self. As the past Atlantis collapsed, the Atlanteans returned to the present along with Manitou's past self, while the destruction of Atlantis in the past ended Gamemnae's attempt to conquer Earth, leaving her for dead and Atlantis submerged once again.

Powers and abilities
Gamemnae is an expert magic wielder. Her demonstrated spells were capable of physically manipulating large numbers of people, ranging from turning the entire population of Atlantis into air-breathers to converting Aquaman into a water wraith. She was also shown to be capable of using a quagmire spell to absorb the bodies of others into herself; Jason Blood observed that few people would risk using such a spell on more than two or three people, yet Gamemnae was able to absorb half a dozen people and remain relatively stable. She was even shown to be capable of reviving the dead; when the dead Justice League were reanimated to fight her, Gamemnae was able to bring them back to life (with the goal of killing them properly).

In other media
Gamemnae appears in Supergirl, portrayed by Cara Buono. This version is a high-ranking Leviathan operative with technokinesis, electrokinesis, and a metallic form who hails from Krypton's sister planet Jarhanpur and came to Earth during the Mesozoic. Introduced in the fifth season and following Rama Khan's failure to defeat Supergirl, Gamemnae relieves him of his duties and takes over Leviathan's operations. She later assumes the alias of Gemma Cooper, a member of Obsidian Tech's board of directors and forms an alliance with Lex Luthor and LuthorCorp.

References

DC Comics Atlanteans
DC Comics female supervillains
DC Comics characters who use magic
Comics characters introduced in 2002
Characters created by Doug Mahnke
Characters created by Joe Kelly